The SA Scientist of the Year is awarded by the South Australian State Government for eminence in science as part of the annual SA Science Excellence and Innovation Awards.

Recipients 
 2007 John Ralston, University of South Australia
 2008 John Hopwood, SAHMRI
 2009 Robert Norman, University of Adelaide
 2010 Tanya Monro, University of Adelaide and Angel F Lopez, SA Pathology
 2011 Peter Langridge, University of Adelaide
 2012 Karen Reynolds, Flinders University
 2013 Graeme Young, Flinders University
 2014 Tony Thomas, University of Adelaide
 2015 Craig Simmons, Flinders University
 2016 Alan J. Cooper, University of Adelaide
 2017 James Paton, University of Adelaide
 2018 Richard Hillis, University of Adelaide
 2019 Josef Gecz, University of Adelaide for research of neurodevelopmental disability 
 2020 Colin Raston Flinders University and Sharad Kumar University of South Australia
 2021 Shizhang Qiao, University of Adelaide for energy conversion and storage technologies

Finalists 

 2022 Maria Makrides, South Australian Health and Medical Research Institute (SAHMRI) and Niki Sperou, Centre for Marine Bioproducts Development (CMBD) at Flinders University

See also 
 List of general science and technology awards 
 List of awards named after people

References

Australian science and technology awards
Awards established in 2007